Cargo! The Quest for Gravity is an action-adventure game developed by Ice-Pick Lodge and published by bitComposer Interactive and Viva Media for Microsoft Windows in 2011.

Reception

The game received "mixed" reviews according to the review aggregation website Metacritic.

References

External links
 

2011 video games
Action-adventure games
BitComposer Interactive games
Ice-Pick Lodge games
Science fiction video games
Single-player video games
Video games developed in Russia
Viva Media games
Windows games
Windows-only games